In graph theory, a regular graph is a graph where each vertex has the same number of neighbors; i.e. every vertex has the same degree or valency. A regular directed graph must also satisfy the stronger condition that the indegree and outdegree of each internal vertex are equal to each other. A regular graph with vertices of degree  is called a  graph or regular graph of degree . Also, from the handshaking lemma, a regular graph contains an even number of vertices with odd degree.

Regular graphs of degree at most 2 are easy to classify: a  graph consists of disconnected vertices, a  graph consists of disconnected edges, and a  graph consists of a disjoint union of cycles and infinite chains.

A  graph is known as a cubic graph.

A strongly regular graph is a regular graph where every adjacent pair of vertices has the same number  of neighbors in common, and every non-adjacent pair of vertices has the same number  of neighbors in common.  The smallest graphs that are regular but not strongly regular are the cycle graph and the circulant graph on 6 vertices.

The complete graph  is strongly regular for any .

A theorem by Nash-Williams says that every  graph on  vertices has a Hamiltonian cycle.

Existence 

It is well known that the necessary and sufficient conditions for a  regular graph of order  to exist are that  and that  is even.

Proof: As we know a complete graph has every pair of distinct vertices connected to each other by a unique edge. So . This is the minimum  for a particular . Also note that if any regular graph has order  then number of edges are  so  has to be even.
In such case it is easy to construct regular graphs by considering appropriate parameters for circulant graphs.

Algebraic properties

Let A be the adjacency matrix of a graph. Then the graph is regular if and only if  is an eigenvector of A.  Its eigenvalue will be the constant degree of the graph.

A regular graph of degree k is connected if and only if the eigenvalue k has multiplicity one. The "only if" direction is a consequence of the Perron–Frobenius theorem.

There is also a criterion for regular and connected graphs :

Let G be a k-regular graph with diameter D and eigenvalues of adjacency matrix . If G is not bipartite, then

Generation 
Fast algorithms exist to enumerate, up to isomorphism, all regular graphs with a given degree and number of vertices.

See also 
 Random regular graph
 Strongly regular graph
 Moore graph
 Cage graph
 Highly irregular graph

References

External links 

 
 
 GenReg software and data by Markus Meringer.
 

Graph families